Rio Vista Delta Breeze is a bus transit service based in Rio Vista, California.

Service and operations
It offers flex fixed-route local service in the cities of Rio Vista and Isleton in addition to commuter service to the Fairfield Transportation Center and Antioch station. There was limited twice weekly service to the Pittsburg/Bay Point BART Station in Bay Point until 2010 when it became a regularly scheduled weekday service.

In Fairfield, Rio Vista Delta Breeze connects with Amtrak and Greyhound. Rio Vista Delta Breeze has an interline agreements with Greyhound.

References

External links
List of Rio Vista Delta Breeze Transit Unlimited Profile
Official website

Bus transportation in California
Public transportation in Sacramento County, California
Public transportation in San Joaquin County, California
Public transportation in Contra Costa County, California